Typeface anatomy describes the graphic elements that make up letters in a typeface.

Strokes 
The strokes are the components of a letterform. If straight, they may be horizontal, vertical, or diagonal; if curved, open or closed.

A main vertical stroke is called a stem. The letter  has three, the left, middle, and right stems.
A stroke which drops below the baseline is a descender.

The bottom of the two-story  is called a loop; the very short stroke at the top is called the ear. The letters  each have a dot or tittle.

The font shown in the example is stressed; this means that strokes have varying widths.  In this example, the stroke at the top of the g is thinner at the top and bottom than on the sides – a vertical stress. Fonts without any variation in the stroke width are called monoline fonts.

Terminals 
The terminal (end) of an instroke or outstroke is often a serif or a stroke ending. A seriffed terminal may be described as a wedge, bulbous, teardrop, slab, etc., depending on the design of the type. Typefaces may be classified by their look, of which the weight and serif style – whether serif or sans-serif – are key features.

Space 
Areas of negative space (white space) formed by straight or curved strokes are called counters. The small corner formed by a serif, whether curved or angular, is called the serif bracket.

Inter-letter space can be reduced with kerning. A kern is the part of a letter that intrudes into the "box" of an adjacent glyph.

Proportions 
A subtle change in proportion impacts weight, perception, measure, and legibility. The letterform height compared to its stroke width modifies the aspect ratio; a slight change in weight sometimes helps to create emphasis. The disparity between thick and thin strokes, known as stress, alters optical perception. As an example, the first sans serif typefaces used strokes of constant thickness, but subsequent technological advances permit drawing thinner strokes. Condensed type occupies less space than expanded type, so that a whole page of text can be reduced to half a page. The capline and x-height ratio improve or decrease word legibility.

Metal type era 

During the late metal type period, many fonts (particularly in American typefounding) were issued to "common line". This meant that they were made to standardised proportions, so that fonts of different typefaces could be mixed with no difficulty. This made it possible to mix typefaces from completely different genres such as sans-serifs and serifs and have the cap height, baseline and linespacing match perfectly, something not possible with most digital fonts. It even allowed mixing of different sizes of type with a consistent baseline. It however had the disadvantage of often forcing typefaces to be issued with cropped descenders compared to historical typefaces, to allow tight linespacing. A "script line" or "art line" was used for more delicate fonts with long descenders. Titling capitals, meanwhile, were issued taking up the whole space of the metal type area, with no room for descenders.

See also 

 Type design
 Type foundry
 Typography
 Typesetting

References

Further reading

External links 

  
Full-size image (1920×1200) giving a more detailed list of typeface elements than in this article.
 Dean, Paul (2008). eXtreme Type Terminology – Part 1, Part 2, Part 3, Part 4 and Part 5
 
 
 
  Blog for Coles' 2012 book The Anatomy of Type: A Graphic Guide to 100 Typefaces.
 

Typography